Sarmatia  is a genus of moths of the family Erebidae. The genus was erected by Achille Guenée in 1854.

Species
Sarmatia albolineata Bethune-Baker, 1911 Angola
Sarmatia ankasoka Viette, 1979 Madagascar
Sarmatia expandens (Walker, 1869)
Sarmatia indenta Bethune-Baker, 1909
Sarmatia interitalis Guenée, 1854 southern Africa
Sarmatia malagasy Viette, 1968 Madagascar
Sarmatia subpallescens (Holland, 1894) western Africa
Sarmatia talhouki Wiltshire, 1982 Arabia

References

Hypeninae